Tyler Jacob Moore is an American actor.

Tyler was born and raised in Catlin, Illinois, to Cynthia Donnell and James Moore. He studied musical theater and acting at Palm Beach Atlantic University in West Palm Beach, Florida, and Howard Fine Acting Studio in Los Angeles. Before his days as a professional actor, he served in an Army reconnaissance platoon. Previous to that, some of his various jobs included: Construction on log cabins, youth outreach, and working for Bunge North America (Filling rail cars with grain being sent as foreign aid to various 3rd world countries). He plays Tony Markovich in the Showtime dramedy Shameless.

He is also known for his portrayal of Pastor John Tudor on GCB.

In July 2014, it was announced that Moore would play Prince Hans on the ABC show Once Upon a Time and made his debut appearance in the third episode of season 4.

Filmography

References

External links

21st-century American male actors
1982 births
Living people
Male actors from Illinois
People from Vermilion County, Illinois
Palm Beach Atlantic University alumni
Illinois National Guard personnel
American male film actors
American male television actors